The Great Loop is a system of waterways that encompasses the eastern portion of the United States and part of Canada. It is made up of both natural and man-made waterways, including the Atlantic and Gulf Intracoastal Waterways, the Great Lakes, the Rideau Canal, and the Mississippi and Tennessee-Tombigbee Waterway.

Overview
There is no single route or itinerary to complete the loop. To avoid winter ice and summer hurricanes, boaters generally traverse the Great Lakes and Canadian waterways in summer, travel down the Mississippi or the Tennessee–Tombigbee Waterway in fall, cross the Gulf of Mexico and Florida in the winter, and travel up the Atlantic Intracoastal Waterway in the spring. Depending on speed of travel, the route may take as little as two months, although more often people take a year to complete the trip. The route may also be completed in segments.

Loopers can begin at any point along the route, and when they return to their starting point they are said to have "crossed their wake" and to have finished the Great Loop.

Route Information
Beginning in the Chicago, Illinois area, "Loopers" have the option to take the Chicago River and Chicago Sanitary and Ship Canal or the Cal-Sag Channel to the Des Plaines River. This passes Joliet and soon becomes the Illinois River. The Illinois River travels west, through several locks, then southward, through Peoria.  Near Grafton the Illinois joins the Mississippi River.

Passing through the Chain of Rocks Lock, a Looper travels past St Louis, Missouri. Boaters continue down the Mississippi River to Cairo, Illinois and then decide whether to continue down the Mississippi to New Orleans, Louisiana or on the more typical Tennessee-Tombigbee Waterway route.

Because of logistical issues such as lack of marinas and fuel sources on the Mississippi, most Loopers turn up the Ohio River at Cairo and travel to Paducah, Kentucky. Soon after, boats take a lock past either the Kentucky Dam or Barkley Dam to reach Kentucky Lake.

Traversing the 184 mile length of Kentucky Lake, Looper boats continue up the Tennessee River and turn off onto the Ten-Tom Waterway near Iuka, Mississippi. A series of locks lower boats to the Lower Tombigbee River.  The Alabama river systems eventually reach Mobile, which is a major port on the Gulf of Mexico.

Continuing eastward using the Intracoastal Waterway (ICW) along the Florida Panhandle, Looper boats eventually cross the Gulf of Mexico to the main part of Florida. The ICW continues from St. Petersburg southward.  Loopers may choose to either cross South Florida via Lake Okeechobee or around it via the Florida Keys.

The route continues up the ICW along Florida's Atlantic Coast, through coastal Georgia, South Carolina, and North Carolina. To reach Chesapeake Bay, boats have a choice of either the Dismal Swamp Canal or the Albemarle and Chesapeake Canal. Cruising north through Chesapeake Bay, Loopers eventually reach the Chesapeake and Delaware Canal and travel through it to Delaware Bay. After crossing Delaware Bay to Cape May, New Jersey all but the smallest boats have to travel in the Atlantic Ocean to New York City.

Entering the Hudson River in New York, boats travel up it to Waterford, NY. Here, some Loopers keep going north on the Champlain Canal and do a side-loop through Montreal.  Most Loopers traverse all or part of the Erie Canal.  Shorter height boats can choose to travel the entire canal, then through Lake Erie, past Detroit, and eventually reaching Lake Huron. Many others (and all with height issues) take the Oswego Canal north to Lake Ontario.  This option allows Loopers to either take the Welland Canal up to Lake Erie or to cruise along the Trent-Severn Waterway in Ontario, Canada.

Lake Huron is the ultimate destination for all Looper boats, regardless of route and any side-trips. The Trent-Severn Waterway terminates in Georgian Bay and the cruising there is particular scenic.  Boats taking the all-USA route travel up Michigan's Lake Huron Coast.  Regardless of options, all boats have to transit the Straits of Mackinac at the top of Michigan's Lower Peninsula and enter Lake Michigan.

Headed to Chicago on Lake Michigan, Loopers have the option to follow either the Wisconsin or Michigan coasts.

Looper culture
Those boaters who are on the loop often fly a white burgee and those who have completed the loop fly a gold one.

The America's Great Loop Cruisers' Association (AGLCA) assists Great Loop cruisers by sharing safety and navigational and cruising information, while providing a networking platform for Loopers through its members-only discussion forum. Boaters can exchange information about topics such as marinas, locking through, water depth, hazards, repairs, fuel prices or dinner reservations and sight seeing. The AGLCA also hosts twice-yearly gatherings for Loopers currently on the Loop and those planning a Great Loop trip.

See also
Inland waterways of the United States

References

External links
What is the Great Loop? NOAA Ocean Service
America's Great Loop Cruiser's Association
Ron and Eva Stob's Raven Cove Publishing
What to Expect Cruising America's Great Loop
Captain John's Great Loop Website

Illinois River
Intracoastal Waterway
Mississippi River
Ohio River
Tennessee River